Oenoptera is a genus of moths of the family Noctuidae, found in Sri Lanka (by George Hampson) and French Guiana (by William Schaus).

Species 
 Oenoptera acidalica Hampson 1910
 Oenoptera albimacula Hampson 1918
 Oenoptera leda Schaus 1914
 Oenoptera purpurea Hampson 1910
 Oenoptera rhea Schaus 1914

References

 "Oenoptera purpurea Hampson, 1910". Catalogue of the Lepidoptera Phalaenae in the British Museum. 10: 259, fig. 73.
 Ubio search
 Schaus, William (1914). New Species of Noctuid Moths from Tropical America. Govt. Printing Office: 498.

Acontiinae